O Premave is a 1999 Indian Kannada-language romance drama film directed by Naganna. The film stars V. Ravichandran along with Rambha, Doddanna and Srinivasa Murthy in prominent roles. Telugu actor Srihari made his debut in Kannada cinema with this film.

The film is a remake of Telugu film Premante Idera (1998) directed by Jayanth Paranjee and starred Venkatesh and Preity Zinta. The film was produced by Jai Jagadish and Vijayalakshmi Singh and the music was composed by V. Ravichandran.

The film upon release met with very good positive response at the box-office.

Cast 

 V. Ravichandran as Raja
 Rambha as Prema
 Srinivasa Murthy
 Srihari
 Sadhu Kokila
 Doddanna
 Keerthi
 Mandya Ramesh
 Umashree
 Bhavyasri Rai
 Kashi
 Bank Janardhan
 Sundar Raj
 Mandeep Roy

Soundtrack 
All the songs are composed and scored by V. Ravichandran. The lyrics are written by K. Kalyan

Reception
Indian Express wrote "[..] director Naganna, who is trying his hand at direction after a long gap, may not be assured of success. During the first half of the film, especially, the story moves at a snail's pace [..] The only consolation is Seetharam’s photography and Umasri, Kashi and Sunderraj’s comedic talents."

References

External links 
 

1999 films
1999 romantic drama films
1990s Kannada-language films
Indian romantic drama films
Kannada remakes of Telugu films
Films scored by V. Ravichandran
Films directed by Naganna